The Whitney Stakes (run as the Whitney Handicap through 2013 and still sometimes referred to as such) is an American Grade 1 stakes race for Thoroughbred racehorses three years of age and older run at a distance of  miles. The current purse is $1,200,000.

Held annually in late July/early August at the Saratoga Race Course in Saratoga Springs, New York, the race is named for the Whitney family, whose members were and remain prominent participants and supporters of the sport of Thoroughbred horse racing.

History
The Whitney Stakes is administered by the New York Racing Association: 

Named after the family that for generations has had so much to do with racing at Saratoga, the Whitney Handicap was first run in 1928. The Whitney family’s involvement with thoroughbreds began when William Collins Whitney, one of the founders of The Jockey Club, began campaigning racehorses in 1898, bearing the familiar Eton blue-and-brown silks. His legacy was carried on by his son, Harry Payne Whitney, and grandson, Cornelius Vanderbilt “Sonny” Whitney, who died in 1992, with other family members involved under various names including Greentree Stables. Whitney-owned horses have won every major race in the United States including multiple wins at the Kentucky Derby, the Preakness Stakes, and the Belmont Stakes.

The Whitney was raced at a distance of  miles from its inception in 1928 until 1955, when the distance was reduced to  miles. Until 1940 it was closed to geldings. The inaugural running was won by William R. Coe's two-time Champion Filly, Black Maria. During World War II, the race was run at Belmont Park from 1943 through 1945, and again once in 1961. Between 1957 and 1969 the race was restricted to horses four years and older.

Some of the greatest horses in American racing history have won the Whitney, including Easy Goer, Tom Fool, Dr. Fager, Stymie, Invasor, Slew o' Gold, Alydar, Ancient Title, Key to the Mint, Devil Diver, Eight Thirty, War Admiral, Discovery, Equipoise and Kelso, who won it for the third time in 1965 at the age of eight. The race also saw one of the most dramatic upsets in racing history when Secretariat finished second in the 1973 Whitney to Allen Jerkens's colt, Onion. Six fillies have won the race: Black Maria (1928), Bateau (1929), Esposa (1937), Gallorette (1948), Lady's Secret (1986), and Personal Ensign (1988).

In 2007, the Breeders' Cup Ltd. introduced the Breeders' Cup Challenge "Win and You're In" qualification format, under which the winner of the Whitney Stakes automatically qualifies for the fall running of the Breeders' Cup Classic.

In the 2015 listing of the International Federation of Horseracing Authorities (IFHA), the Whitney tied with the Kentucky Derby as the top Grade 1 race in the United States outside of the Breeders' Cup races.

Records
Speed record: 
  miles – 1:46.64 – Lawyer Ron (2007)
  miles – 2:02.00 – Devil Diver  (1944) & Bolingbroke  (1943)

Most wins:
 3 – Kelso (1961, 1963, 1965)
 3 – Discovery (1934, 1935, 1936)

Most wins by an owner:
 6 – Greentree Stable (1931, 1942, 1944, 1951, 1953, 1958)

Most wins by a jockey:
 5 – Pat Day (1986, 1987, 1989, 1995, 1998)
 5 – Jerry Bailey (1992, 1997, 1999, 2001, 2003)

Most wins by a trainer:
 5 – John M. Gaver Sr. (1942, 1944, 1951, 1953, 1958)

Winners

 * 1961 – Our Hope won the race but was disqualified from 1st to 2nd.

References

Horse races in New York (state)
Open mile category horse races
Grade 1 stakes races in the United States
Breeders' Cup Challenge series
Saratoga Race Course
Recurring sporting events established in 1928
 
1928 establishments in New York (state)